Moon In-seop (born January 21, 1996), known professionally as Don Malik is a South Korean rapper. In 2020, he released his debut studio album Malik the Cactus Flower, which received critical acclaim.

Early life and education 
Moon In-seop was born on January 21, 1996, in Seoul. He became interested in hip hop after listening to Drunken Tiger and MC Sniper's music. He decided to become a rapper when he was in the second year of high school and took rap lessons from rapper JJK.

He graduated from Hongik University High School.

Career

2014-2018: Signing to Daze Alive Music 
In 2014, Don Malik signed to Daze Alive Music and released his debut single "The Way I Am". In 2015, he released collaboration album Umbilical Cord with record producer Mild Beats, whose lead single "About Muse" received critical acclaim. In 2016, he released collaboration album Tribeast with record producer Kima, which received critical acclaim.

2019-present: Signing to Ambition Musik 
In 2020, he released his debut studio album Malik the Cactus Flower, which received critical acclaim. In 2021, he signed to Ambition Musik and released his second studio album Paid in Seoul. In 2022, he appeared on Show Me the Money 11.

Controversy 
In February 2018, Don Malik was accused of sexually harassing an underage fan and was kicked out of Daze Alive. However, in September 2018, he disclosed his non-indictment letter and claimed that he was innocent.

Discography

Studio albums

Collaboration albums

Filmography

Television shows

Awards and nominations

References

External link 
 

1996 births
Living people
Musicians from Seoul
Show Me the Money (South Korean TV series) contestants
South Korean male rappers